, also known in English as Sentsūzan, is a mountain located on the border of Nichinan, Tottori Prefecture and Okuizumo, Shimane Prefecture, in Japan. Mount Sentsū was historically on the border of the ancient provinces of Hōki Province and Izumo Province. The base of Mount Sentsū is primarily composed of granite. This granite is a rich source of iron sand, and the mountain was historically known as a source for this material.

Etymology

The name of Mount Sentsū in Japanese is formed from two kanji. The first, means "boat" and the second,  means "to cross".

Association with Susanoo legend

According to the Kojiki, Mount Sentsū is the scene of the legendary battle between Susanoo and Yamata no Orochi. Yamata no Orochi, an 8-headed and 8-tailed Japanese dragon, tormented residents of the Izumo area. Susanoo, the Shinto god of the sea and storms, slew Yamata no Orochi at the foot of Mount Sentsū, and his blood flowed into the Hi River (today known as Hii River). Yamata no Orochi's corpse produced Kusanagi-no-Tsurugi, a Japanese sword and one of three Imperial Regalia of Japan that legitimate the rule of the Emperor. Susanoo then presented the sword to his sister, the Sun Goddess Amaterasu, who passed it to her descendants, the Imperial family of Japan.

Transportation 

Mount Sentsū is a popular hiking destination. It is accessible from the Shōyama Station in Nichinan via the JR West Hakubi Line.

References

Sentsu
Sentsu
Tourist attractions in Tottori Prefecture
Tourist attractions in Shimane Prefecture
Nichinan, Tottori